Jacopo Lazzarini (born 22 August 1994), known professionally as Lazza, is an Italian rapper and record producer.

Biography 
Lazzarini was born in Milan, more precisely in the Calvairate district. From a young age, he cultivated a passion for music, which led him to study piano at the Giuseppe Verdi Conservatory in Milan. He later moved into the world of hip hop, joining the Zero2 and Blocco Recordz collectives. In 2009, he took part in the annual Italian hip hop event Tecniche Perfette.

On November 5, 2012 he released his first mixtape album Destiny Mixtape, later followed by the second mixtape K1 Mixtape, produced by DJ Telaviv of Blocco Recordz, released on December 29, 2014. In the same year, Lazza collaborated with Italian rapper Emis Killa on the singles "Bestie" and "Bella idea", contained in the latter's album Keta Music Vol. 2.

On April 14, 2017 he released his first studio album Zzala which, compared to the previous mixtapes, is characterised by a cross between trap sounds and the use of the classically inspired piano. From the album were extracted the singles "MOB", in collaboration with rappers Nitro and Salmo, and "Lario", both being certified platinum. The album was promoted through a tour divided into two seasonal legs, the Zzala Tour. In the following months, he devoted himself to the production of songs by various Italian artists including Ernia ("Disgusting"), Nitro ("Passepartout"), and Salmo ("Lunedì").

Preceded by the singles "Porto Cervo", "Gucci Ski Mask" and "Netflix", the former being certified gold, Lazza released his second studio album Re Mida which constitutes a further evolution of the artist's musical style, which almost totally embraces trap musicality. The album reached the top of Classifica FIMI Artisti and was certified platinum. On October 3, 2019 two re-releases of the album were released: Re Mida (Aurum) and Re Mida (Piano Solo): the former contains some previously unreleased tracks and new collaborations, while the latter contains several tracks rearranged for solo piano tracks, being reinterpreted by the rapper.

On July 17, 2020 he released the third mixtape J, composed of ten tracks featuring the collaboration of various Italian rappers Capo Plaza, Tha Supreme, Guè Pequeno, Shiva, Rondodasosa, Dark Polo Gang and Gemitaiz. In the same year he featured on three tracks of the mixtape Bloody Vinyl 3 of DJ producers Slait, Low Kidd, Young Miles and Tha Supreme.

On April 8, 2022 he released the third studio album Sirio, The album debuts at the top of the Classifica FIMI Artisti and, after a double platinum certification, is recognised as the longest-running album to top the FIMI Albums Chart in the last ten years (14 weeks), beating the previous record held by The Kolors' album Out.

On 4 December 2022, it was officially announced Lazza participation in the Sanremo Music Festival 2023. "Cenere" was later announced as his entry for the Sanremo Music Festival 2023, finishing 2nd.

Discography

Studio albums

Mixtape albums

Singles

As lead artist

As featured artist

Tournées 

 2017 – Fuego Tour
 2017 – Zzala Tour
 2019 – Re Mida Tour
 2022 – Sirio Tour

References 

Living people
1994 births
Italian rappers
Italian record producers
21st-century Italian male musicians
Rappers from Milan